Lazarus Immanuel Fuchs (5 May 1833 – 26 April 1902) was a Jewish-German mathematician who contributed important research in the field of linear differential equations. He was born in Moschin (Mosina) (located in Grand Duchy of Posen) and died in Berlin, Germany. He was buried in Schöneberg in the St. Matthew's Cemetery. His grave in section H is preserved and listed as a grave of honour of the State of Berlin.

He is the eponym of Fuchsian groups and functions, and the Picard–Fuchs equation.
A singular point a of a linear differential equation 

is called Fuchsian if p and q are meromorphic around the point a,
and have poles of orders at most 1 and 2, respectively.
According to a theorem of Fuchs, this condition is necessary and sufficient
for the regularity of the singular point, that is, to ensure the existence
of two linearly independent solutions of the form
 
where the exponents  can be determined from the equation. In the case when 
is an integer this formula has to be modified.

Another well-known result of Fuchs is the Fuchs's conditions, the necessary and sufficient conditions
for the non-linear differential equation of the form

to be free of movable singularities.

An interest remark about him as a teacher during the period of his work at the Heidelberg University pertains to his manner of lecturing: his knowledge of the mathematics he was assigned to teach was so deep that he was wont not to prepare before giving a lecture — he would simply improvise on the spot, while exposing the students to the train of thought taken by mathematicians of the finest degree.

Lazarus Fuchs was the father of Richard Fuchs, a German mathematician.

Selected works 
 Über Funktionen zweier Variabeln, welche durch Umkehrung der Integrale zweier gegebener Funktionen entstehen, Göttingen 1881.
 Zur Theorie der linearen Differentialgleichungen, Berlin 1901.
 Gesammelte Werke, Hrsg. von Richard Fuchs und Ludwig Schlesinger. 3 Bde. Berlin 1904–1909.

References

External links 

 G. B. Mathews (1902) Lazarus Fuchs Nature 66:156,7 (#1702).
 
 

1833 births
1902 deaths
19th-century German Jews
Converts to Lutheranism from Judaism
People from Poznań County
People from the Grand Duchy of Posen
Humboldt University of Berlin alumni
Academic staff of the University of Greifswald
19th-century German mathematicians
20th-century German mathematicians
19th-century Lutherans
Members of the Göttingen Academy of Sciences and Humanities
Members of the Royal Society of Sciences in Uppsala